"Blind" is a song and single by Gibraltarian flamenco metal band Breed 77. It was exclusively released as a download exactly a week prior to the release of the album In My Blood (En Mi Sangre).

Blind was one of Bruce Dickinson's top 5 singles of 2006.

Track listing
 "Blind" (Radio edit)
 "Someone Tell Me"
 "Once Again"

References

2006 singles
Breed 77 songs
2006 songs
Albert Productions singles